Aslan Atem (born January 7, 1991) is a Turkish wrestler of Turkish Meskhetian origin, competing in the 80 kg division of Greco-Roman wrestling. He is a member of the İstanbul Büyükşehir Belediyesi S.K.

Atem debuted internationally at the 2008 European Championships for Cadets and won the gold medal in the 76 kg division in Daugavpils, Latvia. At the 2010 Mediterranean Championship held in Istanbul, Turkey, he became bronze medalist in the 84 kg division. Atem won the gold medal in the 84 kg division at the 2010 European Championships for Juniors in Samokov, Bulgaria. He became bronze medalist at the 2016 European Wrestling Championships in Riga, Latvia. He won the silver medal at the 2016 World University Wrestling Championship held in Çorum, Turkey. He was silver medalist at the Golden Grand Prix 2016 in Baju, Azerbaijan. He captured the silver medal at the 2016 World Wrestling Championships held in Budapest, Hungary. He became bronze medalist at the 2017 European Wrestling Championships in Novi Sad, Serbia.

References

External links
 

Living people
1991 births
Place of birth missing (living people)
Meskhetian Turkish people
Turkish male sport wrestlers
Istanbul Büyükşehir Belediyespor athletes
European Wrestling Championships medalists
World Wrestling Championships medalists
20th-century Turkish people
21st-century Turkish people